Brems may refer to:
BREMS (Musician), (born 1992), a Canadian singer-songwriter 
 Brems (automobile), a Danish brand of the early 20th century
 Brems, Indiana, an unincorporated community in the United States
 Eva Brems (born 1969), a Belgian human rights defender and politician